The 1988–89 Eliteserien season was the 32nd season of ice hockey in Denmark. Seven teams participated in the league, and Frederikshavn IK won the championship.

Regular season

Playoffs
The top 4 teams from the regular season qualified for the playoffs. Frederikshavn IK defeated AaB Ishockey in the final, and Herning IK defeated Herlev IK in the 3rd place game.

External links
Season on eliteprospects.com

Dan
1988-89
1988 in Danish sport
1989 in Danish sport